Discotenes is a genus of fungus weevils in the beetle family Anthribidae. There are about nine described species in Discotenes.

Species
These nine species belong to the genus Discotenes:
 Discotenes affinis Jordan
 Discotenes arizonica (Schaeffer, 1906)
 Discotenes coelebs Imhoff, 1842
 Discotenes consors Jordan, 1904
 Discotenes cylindratus Jordan
 Discotenes imitans Jordan
 Discotenes lutosus Jordan
 Discotenes nigrotuberculata (Schaeffer, 1904)
 Discotenes picticollis Jordan

References

Further reading

 
 

Anthribidae
Articles created by Qbugbot